The 2012 season for the  cycling team began in January at the Tour Down Under. As a UCI ProTeam, they were automatically invited and obligated to send a squad to every event in the UCI World Tour.

Ahead of the season, the team again changed names – for the fifth time in as many years – from Garmin–Cervélo to Garmin-Barracuda, after Barracuda Networks joined the team as its co-sponsor. Despite giving up the team's second name, Cervélo remains with the team as its official bicycle supplier. Before the Tour de France, the team acquired Sharp as a secondary title sponsor, with the team's name becoming Garmin–Sharp for UCI designation, although retaining Barracuda for the team's own publications as Garmin–Sharp–Barracuda.

2012 roster
Ages as of January 1, 2012.

Riders who joined the team for the 2012 season

Riders who left the team during or after the 2011 season

Season victories

Footnotes

References

2012 road cycling season by team
2012
2012 in American sports